Edward Allan Farnsworth (June 30, 1928 – January 31, 2005) was one of America's most renowned legal scholars on contracts. His writings were standard reference in courtrooms and law schools.

Biography
Born in Providence, Rhode Island, he received a bachelor's degree in applied mathematics from the University of Michigan in 1948 and a master's degree in physics from Yale University in 1949.  He earned his law degree from Columbia Law School in 1952.  After serving in the U.S. Air Force JAG and briefly working in private practice, he began teaching at Columbia Law.  Starting his career as the school's youngest professor, Farnsworth taught for over 50 years.

A leading scholar, Farnsworth invested ten years as reporter for the influential 1981 Restatement (Second) of Contracts stabilizing a fluid area of American law.  His "Farnsworth on Contracts" is among the most heavily referenced texts on contract law.

Farnsworth was elected to the American Philosophical Society in 1994.

In January 2005, Prof. Farnsworth died in Englewood, New Jersey, aged 76.

Bibliography

References

External links
 E. Allan Farnsworth Memorial Information
 New York Times Obituary, February 6, 2005

American legal scholars
American legal writers
Columbia Law School alumni
Columbia University faculty
2005 deaths
Scholars of contract law
1928 births
University of Michigan College of Literature, Science, and the Arts alumni
People from Englewood, New Jersey
Yale Graduate School of Arts and Sciences alumni
Members of the American Philosophical Society